The 2014 Città di Caltanissetta was a professional tennis tournament played on clay courts. It was the 16th edition of the tournament which was part of the 2014 ATP Challenger Tour. It took place in Caltanissetta, Italy between 9 and 15 June 2014.

Singles main-draw entrants

Seeds

 1 Rankings are as of May 26, 2014.

Other entrants
The following players received wildcards into the singles main draw:
  Salvatore Caruso
  Matteo Donati
  Claudio Fortuna
  Gianluca Naso

The following players received entry from the qualifying draw:
  Claudio Grassi
  Christian Lindell
  Markus Eriksson
  Alexander Zverev

Doubles main-draw entrants

Seeds

1 Rankings as of May 26, 2014.

Other entrants
The following pairs received wildcards into the doubles main draw:
  Omar Giacalone /  Gianluca Naso
  Salvatore Caruso /  Walter Trusendi
  Nicolas Jarry /  Alexander Zverev

Champions

Singles

 Pablo Carreño Busta def.  Facundo Bagnis, 4–6, 6–4, 6–1

Doubles

 Daniele Bracciali /  Potito Starace def.  Pablo Carreño Busta /  Enrique López Pérez, 6–3, 6–3

External links
Official Website

Citta di Caltanissetta
Città di Caltanissetta